Loitokitok, also Oloitokitok, is a town in Kajiado County, Kajiado South Constituency close to the Tanzania and Kenya border.

Location

Loitokitok town lies within the foothills and in a view of the Tanzania highest mountain, Mount Kilimanjaro.
 

Overview
Loitokitok is small but growing town in southeastern Kenya, at the border with Tanzania. The town was previously the administrative headquarters of the former Loitokitok District in which it was located. Loitokitok is served by a general government hospital and by Loitokitok Airstrip.

Population
At this time there is no recent, reliable population estimate for the town of Loitokitok.

Points of Interest
Loitokitok or its environs, is the location of the following points of interest:

 The offices of Loitokitok Town Council
 The headquarters of Loitokitok District Administration
 Loitokitok General Hospital - Owned and administered by the Kenya Ministry of Health
 Loitokitok Post Office
 The International border between Kenya and the Republic of Tanzania - the border lies immediately southwest of the central business district of Loitokitok.
 A branch of Kenya Commercial Bank - A private financial institution
 A branch of Equity Bank Kenya - A private financial institution
 Loitokitok Airport - A public, civilian airfield
 A branch of Kenya Women Microfinance Bank , A private financial institution

References

External links
Elevation of Loitokitok

Populated places in Kajiado County
Kenya–Tanzania border crossings
Mount Kilimanjaro